Cooper Michael Raiff (born February 11, 1997) is an American filmmaker and actor. He has received critical acclaim for his films Shithouse (2020) and Cha Cha Real Smooth (2022). He appeared on the 2022 Variety list of directors to watch. In August 2022, Raiff launched his production company Small Ideas.

Early life
A native of Dallas, Raiff attended the Greenhill School in Addison, Texas. He participated in school theatre productions and studied at the Dallas Young Actors Studio for 4 years. During his senior year, he wrote and performed in his first play. Raiff enrolled at Occidental College in  Los Angeles and withdrew in 2019 to focus on film.

Career

During spring break in 2018, Raiff stayed on campus to make Madeline & Cooper, a 50-minute short film that he uploaded to YouTube. He then tweeted a link of the video to filmmaker Jay Duplass, who met with Raiff and encouraged him to adapt the project to feature-length; it became Raiff's 
debut feature Shithouse, in which he starred, directed, wrote, produced, and co-edited. The film premiered at the 2020 SXSW where it was named Best Narrative Feature. Distributed by IFC Films, it opened in October 2020 to positive reviews.

Raiff's second film, Cha Cha Real Smooth, premiered at the 2022 Sundance Film Festival, where it won the Audience Award for the Dramatic Competition, and is set to be distributed by Apple TV+. The film was reportedly purchased by the company for $15 million.

Raiff's next film will be The Trashers, based on the true story of the Danbury Trashers, starring David Harbour as mobster James Galante and Cooper Hoffman as his son, AJ. For his first television project, Raiff is attached to direct and co-write an adaptation of Naoise Dolan's novel Exciting Times starring Phoebe Dynevor for Amazon Prime.

On August 2, 2022, it was announced that Raiff has partnered with Clementine Quittner of Black Bear Productions to launch his own production company called Small Ideas. Raiff commented on the company, and the film industry at large, saying, "There's a very good, lucrative market for making small things and flipping them, and if you're okay with them being maybe like a streamer-theatrical duo, I think everyone should be really feeling great and confident about getting their stuff made that they want to make."

On October 16, 2022, Raiff was given the Maverick Award at the Newport Beach Film Festival.

On November 18, 2022, Raiff was named Forbes 30 under 30 for Hollywood & Entertainment.

Artistry 
Raiff has cited Emma Seligman, Sofia Coppola, Greta Gerwig, Ryan Coogler, and the Duplass brothers as influences.

Filmography

Film

Awards and recognition

References

External links
 

Living people
Year of birth uncertain
21st-century American male actors
21st-century American screenwriters
Film directors from Texas
Male actors from Dallas
Screenwriters from Texas
1997 births